Yanya Caballista: City Skater, known in Japan as , is an extreme sports skating game for the PlayStation 2.

Gameplay
The game was packaged with a fingerboard. The fingerboard was to be placed on top of both of the analogue sticks and would be controlled on top of them to resemble controlling a skate board on its wheels.

The game had 3 different modes; a practice mode, a "ramp" mode, and a campaign mode. Both the practice mode and the ramp mode allowed the player to unlock one of 7 characters.

The campaign mode consisted of 5 different stages, divided in sections that unlocked if the player eliminated all Gawoos in the previous section before the countdown timer ran out, which could be avoided by collecting the coins scattered around the level. Once all Gawoos in the level were eliminated the player would have to beat a boss, unusually powerful Gawoos with unique abilities and above average life bars and some sort of protections surrounding them.

Reception

The game received "mixed" reviews according to the review aggregation website Metacritic. In Japan, however, Famitsu gave it a score of 30 out of 40. Scott Steinberg of Next Generation called it "a bonzo extreme product so foreign in origin and design that it could pass for a Kia."

References

External links

2001 video games
Koei games
Multiplayer and single-player video games
PlayStation 2 games
PlayStation 2-only games
Skateboarding video games
Video games developed in Japan
Video games with cel-shaded animation